Robert A. Burns (May 27, 1944 – May 31, 2004) was an American art director and production designer who worked on many films including The Texas Chain Saw Massacre, The Hills Have Eyes, The Howling, Re-Animator, and From Beyond.

Career
Burns attended the University of Texas where he was editor of The Texas Ranger.

Burns first entered the film industry as the casting director and art director of Tobe Hooper's 1974 horror film The Texas Chain Saw Massacre. His work on the film is notable for the realistic "bone decor" of the Sawyer Family's farm house.

His work garnered notice in the industry and work on other future horror classics followed including Wes Craven's The Hills Have Eyes, Joe Dante's The Howling, and Stuart Gordon's Re-Animator.

Burns was also an expert on Rondo Hatton and had aspired to make a film about the actor. His passion was such that he held parties to celebrate Hatton's birthday. The 2020 documentary titled Rondo and Bob  looks at the lives of both Burns and Hatton.

Death
Burns died on May 31, 2004. It was reported that he was suffering from kidney cancer. His death was investigated as a suicide: he had left a farewell note on his website with a photo of himself stretched out in front of a tombstone with his name on it.

Selected filmography

Art director
 The Texas Chain Saw Massacre
 The Hills Have Eyes
 Tourist Trap
 Don't Go Near the Park
 Disco Godfather
 Microwave Massacre
 The Howling
 Full Moon High
 Re-Animator

Actor
The Howling – Porn store patron
Microwave Massacre – Homeless Man
Confessions of a Serial Killer – Daniel Ray Hawkins 
Walker, Texas Ranger – Man in Overalls (ep. "The Big Bingo Bamboozle")
The Stars Fell on Henrietta – Franklin

Director
Mongrel

References

External links
 

1944 births
2004 deaths
American art directors
American production designers